NGC 540 is a barred lenticular galaxy in the constellation Cetus. It is estimated to be 451 million light years from the Milky Way and has a diameter of approximately 120,000 light years. The object was discovered on October 15, 1885 by the American astronomer Francis Preserved Leavenworth.

See also 
 List of NGC objects (1–1000)

References

External links
 

540
Barred lenticular galaxies
Cetus (constellation)
005410